A la Carte is the sixth full-length studio album by German progressive rock band Triumvirat, released in 1978.

Track listing 
"Waterfall" (Jürgen Fritz) – 4:48
"Late Again" (Fritz) – 6:48
"Jo Ann Walker" (Fritz) – 4:46
"For You" (Fritz) – 5:53
"I Don't Even Know Your Name" (Fritz) – 4:47
"A Bavarian in New York" (Fritz) – 5:38
"Original Soundtrack from the Movie O.C.S.I.D." (Fritz, Matthias Holtmann, Werner Kopal) – 3:48
"Darlin'" (Mike Love, Brian Wilson) – 3:46
"Good Bye" (Fritz) – 4:28
Bonus Tracks included on the 2002 reedition. 
"Waterfall" (Single Version) – 3:38
"Jo Ann Walker" (Single Version) – 3:48

Musicians 
 Hans-Jürgen Fritz – Keyboards, Hammond organ, Moog synthesizer, piano, electric piano 
 David Hanselmann, Barry Palmer (1, 5, 8) –  Lead Vocals 
 Ed Carter, Wolfgang Maus – Guitar 
 Buell Neidlinger, Steve Edelman, Werner Kopal – Bass 
 Charly Schlimbach, Michael Andreas – Saxophone 
 Matthias Holtmann – Drums, Marimba, Wood Block, Bell Tree, Tambourine, Timbales
 Malando Gassama – Bell Tree, Tambourine, Timbales, Cabasa, Shaker, Tambourine, Vibraslap, Cowbell, Congas, Maracas, Voice, 
 Diana Lee, Marty McCall, Myrna Matthews – Backing Vocals

Orchestra & Chorus 
 Bonnie Douglas, Brian Leonard, John Wittenberg, Ken Yerke, Linda Rose, Mari Tsumura, Michelle Grab, Peter Kent, Robert Dubow, Robert Lipsett, Spiro Stamof – Violins 
 Dan Neufels, Denise Buffom, Linda Lipsett, Sam Bogossian – Violas
 Fred Seykora, Glenn Grab, Gloria Strassner, Juliana Buffom – Cellos 
 Jene Cipriano, Bob Hardaway, Tommy Johnson – Tuba 
 Bill Lamb, Mark Isham, Richard Hurwitz – Trumpet
 Randy Alcroft, Vinnie Fannele – Trombone 
 Alan Robinson, Marie Robinson – French Horn 
 Bill Cole, Jules Chaikin – Contractor 
 Gordon Marron – Conductor 
 Israel Baker – Concertmaster
 Allan Davies, Darice Richman, David Hanselmann, Diana Lee, Fred Frank, Gene Merlino, Gene Moredro, Gloria G. Prosper, Jackie Ward, Jan Gassman, Jerry Whitman, Jon Osbrink, Karen Kenton, Larry Kenton, Linda Harmon, Myrna Matthews, Peggy Clark, Rob Stevens, Sally Stevens, Stan Farber, Sue Allen, Susie McCyne, Terry Stilwell, Walt Harrah, Bill Brown – Chorus

References

 Musicians : https://www.discogs.com/fr/Triumvirat-%C3%80-La-Carte/release/168685

External links
Official band website

Triumvirat albums
1978 albums